= Ravenseye, West Virginia =

- Unincorporated community
- Location within West Virginia Location within the United States
- Coordinates: 38°00′14″N 80°53′45″W
- Country: United States
- State: West Virginia
- County: Fayette
- Elevation: 2,736 ft (834 m)
- Time zone: UTC-5 (Eastern (EST))
  - Summer (DST): UTC-4 (EDT)
- GNIS ID: 1549891

Ravenseye or Ravens Eye is an unincorporated community in Fayette County, West Virginia, United States.
